is a Buddhist temple in Fujiidera, Osaka, Japan. The temple is associated with Shingon Buddhism and has as its main image a sculpture of the Thousand-armed Kannon. It is the fifth temple on the Saigoku Kannon Pilgrimage.

Overview 
The temple was founded on the order of Emperor Shōmu in 725 and consecrated by the monk Gyōki. It became part of a system of provincial temples (Kokubun-ji) founded by the state with the purpose of providing prayers and other services for the protection of the nation and the Imperial House. Archaeological finds on the temple grounds confirm the foundation of the temple in the 8th century and the connection to the Fujii family, descendants of the royal house of Baekje, which had migrated to Japan.

The temple was promoted by the imperial family through the centuries. Renovations are known by Prince Abo in 806 and by Ariwara no Narihira. Among the patrons of the temple was the Heian period politician Sugawara no Michizane. In 1096, Fujii Yasumoto had a number of buildings restored. The Emperors Go-Daigo and Go-Murakami are said to have been admirers of the temple's main image. The temple was destroyed by earthquake in 1510 and renovated in 1602 by Toyotomi Hideyori. The four gates of the temple date from this time. The present main hall was completed in 1776.

The main image is a seated sculpture of a thousand-armed and eleven-headed Kannon, produced in a dry lacquer technology, and designated as a National Treasure of Japan. The statue has a total of 1041 arms: 2 main arms with the hand palms facing each other in front of the statue, 38 large and 1001 small arms extending from behind the body.

See also 
List of National Treasures of Japan (sculptures)

References 

 
 Patricia Frame Rugola: The Saikoku Kannon Pilgrimage Route. Dissertation, Ohio State University, 1986.
 Valeria Jana Schwanitz und August Wierling: Saigoku - Unterwegs in Japans westlichen Landen. Manpuku-Verlag, Potsdam 2012, .

.

Buddhist temples in Osaka Prefecture
Buddhist pilgrimage sites in Japan
Religious buildings and structures completed in 725
8th-century Buddhist temples